The Bangkok Biennial is a biennial exhibition of contemporary art which was inaugurated in 2018.  The first edition ran from July 1 until September 30.  It was the first biennial/biennale event to take place in Thailand. Organised in a decentralised and open-access manner, the 2018 Bangkok Biennial did not have a central curatorial team and was made up of autonomous, self-organised pavilions.  Most of the pavilions were located in the city of Bangkok, additional pavilion were located in other parts of Thailand and in the Netherlands and Japan online.

Preceding the Thailand Biennale and the Bangkok Art Biennale, the Bangkok Biennial is one of three very different biennial art events all inaugurated in Thailand in the second half of 2018

The founders of the Bangkok Biennial have remained anonymous to date. They have claimed this is in an effort to work against traditional 'top-down' approaches

Artist in 2018 edition 

An unknown number of artists were included in the first edition of the Bangkok Biennial. Originally billed as "150+" artists, the event's website, published materials and mobile application listed 249 artists when the event opened in July 2018. The actual number is likely higher.

References

External links
 

Events in Bangkok
Arts festivals in Thailand